The Burns Lake Site is a historic site in Ochopee, Florida. It is located three miles west of Ochopee on U.S. 41. On May 27, 1986, it was added to the U.S. National Register of Historic Places.

References

External links
 Collier County listings at nationalregisterofhistoricplaces.com

Archaeological sites in Florida
National Register of Historic Places in Collier County, Florida
National Register of Historic Places in Big Cypress National Preserve